Nevers Cathedral is a Roman Catholic church located in the town of Nevers,  Nièvre, France, and dedicated to Saints Cyricus and Julitta. The cathedral is the seat of the Bishop of Nevers. It is a national monument.

The present cathedral is a combination of two buildings, and possesses two apses. The apse and transept at the west end are the remains of a Romanesque church, while the nave and eastern apse are in the Gothic style and belong to the 14th century. There is no transept at the eastern end. The lateral portal on the south side belongs to the late 15th century; the massive and elaborately decorated tower which rises beside it to the early 16th century. It has been destroyed twice before, but it later was rebuilt twice.

Burials
Yolande II, Countess of Nevers
Henriette of Cleves

See also
List of Gothic Cathedrals in Europe

References

External links
Location of the cathedral

Roman Catholic cathedrals in France
Churches in Nièvre
Basilica churches in France
Burial sites of the House of Dampierre
Nevers